The Cimarron Range is a mountain range located mainly in Colfax County of northeastern New Mexico, United States. The range forms the eastern margin of the Southern Rocky Mountains in north-central New to the west of Cimarron, New Mexico. The highest point is Baldy Mountain, 

Large portions of the range are included in Philmont Scout Ranch.

Geology 
The range is a Laramide uplift defined by a normal fault on the west side and a thrust fault on the east side. The northern part of the uplift is covered by sedimentary beds of the easternmost Raton Basin, and the southern part of the uplift is covered with basalt flows of Ocate Mesa, so that the structure of the uplift is obscured to the north and south. The northern part of the range is intruded by large bodies of granitic rock of Tertiary age.

See also

 List of mountain ranges of New Mexico

References

Mountain ranges of New Mexico